UFC 165: Jones vs. Gustafsson was a mixed martial arts event held on September 21, 2013, at the Air Canada Centre in Toronto, Ontario, Canada. The main event was inducted into the UFC Hall of Fame's Fight Wing in 2021.

Background

The main event featured a UFC Light Heavyweight Championship bout between current champion Jon Jones and Alexander Gustafsson.  Gustafsson earned his title fight by winning six straight fights in the light heavyweight division. Additionally, Jones was looking to surpass the number of Light Heavyweight title defenses originally set by Tito Ortiz.

Co-featured on the card was a rescheduled Interim Bantamweight Championship bout between the current champion Renan Barão, and former WEC Bantamweight Champion and top contender Eddie Wineland.  The pairing was first planned as the headliner at UFC 161, but was removed from that event after Barão injured his foot.

Mark Bocek was expected to face Michel Prazeres at this event. However, Bocek pulled out due to an injury and was replaced by UFC newcomer Jesse Ronson.

Norifumi Yamamoto was expected to face Ivan Menjivar at the event.  However, Yamamoto was removed from the bout and was replaced by Wilson Reis.

The event also aired October 17, 2013, on Fox Sports 1 less than a month after it took place as part of a special UFC Reloaded.

Results

Bonus awards
The following fighters were awarded $50,000 bonuses.
 Fight of The Night: Jon Jones vs. Alexander Gustafsson
 Knockout of The Night: Renan Barão
 Submission of the Night: Mitch Gagnon

See also
List of UFC events
2013 in UFC

References

Ultimate Fighting Championship events
2013 in mixed martial arts
Mixed martial arts in Canada
Sports competitions in Toronto
Events in Toronto
2013 in Canadian sports
September 2013 sports events in Canada